Achitsky District is an administrative district (raion), one of the thirty in Sverdlovsk Oblast, Russia. As a municipal division, it is incorporated as Achitsky Urban Okrug. Its administrative center is the urban locality (a work settlement) of Achit. Population: 16,807 (2010 Census);  The population of Achit accounts for 29.4% of the district's total population.

References

Sources

Districts of Sverdlovsk Oblast